Pseudobaptigenin is an isoflavone, a type of flavonoid. It can be isolated in Trifolium pratense (red clover).

References

Isoflavones
Benzodioxoles